Henry Charles Boucha (born June 1, 1951) is an American former professional ice hockey center. Boucha played in both the National Hockey League (NHL) and World Hockey Association (WHA) between 1971 and 1977. In the NHL he played for the Detroit Red Wings, Minnesota North Stars, Kansas City Scouts and Colorado Rockies, while he played for the Minnesota Fighting Saints of the WHA. His career was cut short by an eye injury. Internationally Boucha played for the American national team at two World Championships and at the 1972 Winter Olympics, where he won a silver medal.

A full-blooded Chippewa Ojibwa, Boucha's distant cousin Gary Sargent and his second cousin T. J. Oshie also played in the NHL.

Amateur career
Boucha played high school hockey for Warroad High School in Warroad, Minnesota leading his team to the 1969 state tournament where he was injured during a 5–4 overtime loss to Edina. He is considered to be one of the best players to ever play Minnesota high school hockey.

While serving in the US Army, Boucha joined the United States national ice hockey team on a full-time basis in 1970 as the US won the "Pool B" qualification tournament. He participated in the 1971 Ice Hockey World Championships in Bern, Switzerland where he scored seven goals in ten games for Team USA. Boucha was also one of the biggest stars of the 1972 United States Olympic hockey team that received the silver medal.

Professional career
Boucha was drafted in the second round, 16th overall by the Detroit Red Wings in the 1971 NHL Entry Draft (he was also drafted first overall by the Minnesota Fighting Saints of the rival WHA but chose not to defect to the WHA). Boucha scored a goal in his first NHL game after the Olympics and was voted Detroit rookie of the year in his first full NHL season. The Red Wings sent him to the Minnesota North Stars in exchange for Danny Grant in 1974. Boucha was enjoying a solid year in his home state; on January 4, 1975, he was assaulted in a highly publicized stick incident by Dave Forbes of the Boston Bruins. The attack left Boucha with a cracked bone around his eye and blurred vision. Forbes was prosecuted for aggravated assault. His trial resulted in a hung jury.

Boucha never really recovered from the injury. He attempted a comeback with the Minnesota Fighting Saints of the WHA in 1975–76 and then returned to the NHL as a free agent with the Kansas City Scouts in later 1975-76. In 1976 the franchise moved to Denver, Colorado and became the Colorado Rockies, from whom he retired from professional hockey after only nine games.

Before the NHL required players to wear a helmet, Boucha wore a headband. His nickname was "the Chief".

Post career
Boucha fell on hard times due to his unexpectedly early retirement from hockey (his agent was negotiating a four-year contract with the North Stars but the talks were never completed due to the injury). He went through a period of divorce, drug and alcohol abuse  before straightening out his life in the 1980s. He has re-established himself in his native community and become active in various Native American causes.

Career statistics

Regular season and playoffs

International

Awards and achievements
 Detroit Red Wings rookie of the year, 1972–73
 Inducted into the United States Hockey Hall of Fame in 1995.

International play

 Ice hockey world championships, Pool B, 1970 (first, won promotion to Pool A)
 Ice hockey world championships, Pool A, 1971 (sixth place)
 Olympic tournament, 1972 (second place)

See also
 List of members of the United States Hockey Hall of Fame

References

External links
 
 Profile at Hockeydraftcentral.com

1951 births
American men's ice hockey centers
Colorado Rockies (NHL) players
Detroit Red Wings draft picks
Detroit Red Wings players
Ice hockey players from Minnesota
Ice hockey players at the 1972 Winter Olympics
Kansas City Scouts players
Living people
Medalists at the 1972 Winter Olympics
Warroad Lakers players
Minnesota Fighting Saints players
Minnesota North Stars players
Native American sportspeople
Native American United States military personnel
Olympic silver medalists for the United States in ice hockey
People from Warroad, Minnesota
United States Army soldiers
United States Hockey Hall of Fame inductees
Virginia Wings players
Winnipeg Jets (WHL) players